1 The Shambles (also known as Barghest) is an historic building in the English city of York, North Yorkshire. A Grade II listed building, standing at the corner of The Shambles and Newgate, part of the building dates to the 14th century, but it was renovated in the 17th and 18th centuries. Its Newgate façade faces King's Square, and this has the functioning doorway to the building. It is this side of the building, which is two storeys, that dates to the 14th century. It adjoins 4A King's Square to form an L-shape. The western side is three storeys, dating to the second half of the 18th century.

Numbers 1 to 5 were modernised in 1970–71, the result of which created a series of individual businesses, with a single suite above for office space.

History
In 1840, the building was occupied by William Brodie's butchers.

Composition
The building is painted brick in Flemish bond. Its shopfront is timber-framed. It has a hipped pantile roof.

Both of the building's doors have decorative transoms.

The building's windows are small-paned canted bays with moulded cornices.

References

01
Houses in North Yorkshire
Buildings and structures in North Yorkshire
14th-century establishments in England
Grade II listed buildings in York
Grade II listed houses
14th century in York